Afroedura praedicta, also known commonly as the Serra da Neve flat gecko, is a species of lizard in the family Gekkonidae. The species is endemic to Angola.

References

praedicta
Reptiles of Angola
Reptiles described in 2021
Taxa named by William Roy Branch
Taxa named by Andreas Schmitz
Taxa named by Werner Conradie